This is a timeline of the Chu–Han Contention.

}

Notes

Chu–Han Contention
Timelines of Chinese events